The Boracay International Funboard Cup is an international funboard cup competition held yearly on Boracay island in the municipality of Malay, Aklan. Started in 2008, the event is one of the region's biggest windsurfing competitions.

Events
The competition consisted of timed slalom races only until 2013, when speed trials, freestyle, and kiting hang-time events were added to the mix. Competition is held in several rounds over a six-day period. Windsurfing is the most recently adopted event in this competition. Every year, 50 of the world's top slalom racers attend the competition as a pit stop through the Asian Windsurfing Tour. Surfers control their surfboard mounted with a sail through a race around buoys. There are typically three "jibes" or straight ways and turns involved in the course. A total of 24 races are typically held in order to keep congestion down during the slalom. Speed trial races are held in conjunction with the other events. The courses are set up to have areas that speed can be gained, and places where boarders have to maintain balance while winds are not easily assessable. The boarders with the fastest time then compete in a race against each other for the title and honor.

The cup takes place on January 9. It is held at Bulabog Beach, since the wind and waters at the White Beach are too mild.

Kiteboarding
Kitesurfing is common in Boracay because of the wind and water conditions needed for the event. A smaller version surfboard is used with the combination of a parachute apparatus to kiteboard. Kiteboarders harness the power of the wind to move through the water and propel themselves into the air to do tricks. The competing kiteboarders gain point ranks based on the amount, difficulty, and uniqueness of the tricks that they pull within a specific time interval. Typically it consists of a three round elimination, yet if it is close, more rounds may be added. This specific event is available to types of boarding other than kiteboarding. Some of the "fancier" tricks and stunts are agreed by the audience.

References

External links
 

Windsurfing competitions
Boracay
Sports in Aklan